Cartwright Airport  is  southwest of Cartwright, Newfoundland and Labrador, Canada.

As of March 2017, Cartwright is not listed as a scheduled destination in the Air Labrador flight schedule.

References

External links
Cartwright Airport on COPA's Places to Fly airport directory

Certified airports in Newfoundland and Labrador